Sun Liang (243 – 260), courtesy name Ziming, was the second emperor of the state of Eastern Wu during the Three Kingdoms period of China. He was the youngest son and heir of Sun Quan, the founding emperor of Wu. He is also known as the Prince of Kuaiji or (less frequently) Marquis of Houguan, which were his successive titles after he was deposed in November 258 by the regent Sun Chen. He was succeeded by his brother Sun Xiu, who managed to oust Sun Chen from power and kill him. Two years after Sun Liang's dethronement, he was falsely accused of treason and demoted from a prince to a marquis, after which he committed suicide.

Early life
Sun Liang was born in 243, to Sun Quan and one of his favourite consorts, Consort Pan. As Sun Quan's youngest son, he was well-cared for by his father, who was very happy to have a son in his old age (60 at the time of Sun Liang's birth). He was also born in a palace atmosphere where officials were aligning themselves with either of his two older brothers who were fighting for supremacy – Sun He, the Crown Prince, and Sun Ba , the Prince of Lu, who had designs on the position. In September or October 250, fed up with Sun Ba's constant attacks against Sun He, Sun Quan inexplicably ordered Sun Ba to commit suicide and deposed Sun He. At the urging of his eldest daughter Sun Luban, who had been making false accusations against Sun He and his mother Lady Wang and therefore wanted to see Sun He deposed, he made Sun Liang the new Crown Prince in December 250 or January 251. Sun Luban then had Sun Liang married to Quan Huijie, a grandniece of her husband, Quan Cong. In 251, Sun Quan instated Sun Liang's mother, Consort Pan, as the Empress.

In 252, Sun Liang lost both his parents in rapid succession. Early that year, Empress Pan was murdered – but how she was murdered remains a mystery. Eastern Wu officials claimed that her servants, unable to stand her temper, strangled her while she was asleep, while a number of historians, including Hu Sanxing, who annotated Sima Guang's Zizhi Tongjian, believed that top Eastern Wu officials were complicit, as they feared that she would seize power as empress dowager after Sun Quan's death. Later that year, Sun Quan died so Sun Liang became the new emperor.

Reign

Zhuge Ke's regency 
Prior to his death, Sun Quan had selected Zhuge Ke as the regent for Sun Liang, at the endorsement of his trusted assistant Sun Jun. The people of the empire also greatly admired Zhuge Ke, as he was already known for his military and diplomatic successes involving the indigenous Baiyue and for his quick wit. However, Sun Quan's only reservation – that Zhuge Ke was arrogant and had overly high opinion of his own abilities – would turn out to be prophetic.

In 252, in light of Sun Quan's death, the Cao Wei regent Sima Shi made a major three-pronged attack against Eastern Wu. Zhuge Ke's forces, however, were able to defeat the main Cao Wei forces, inflicting heavy losses. Zhuge Ke's reputation became even more established. In 253, he carried out a plan he had for a while – to gather up nearly all service-eligible young men of Eastern Wu to make a major attack against Cao Wei – despite opposition from a number of other officials. He further coordinated his attack with Jiang Wei, a general from Eastern Wu's ally state Shu Han. However, his strategy turned out to be faulty – he initially targeted Shouchun (壽春; in present-day Lu'an, Anhui) but, on his way, changed his mind and attacked Hefei instead, despite the fact that Hefei's defences were strong and intended to withstand major Eastern Wu attacks. Zhuge Ke's forces became worn out by the long siege and suffered plagues – which Zhuge Ke ignored. He eventually withdrew after Cao Wei reinforcements arrived, but instead of returning to the capital Jianye (present-day Nanjing, Jiangsu) to apologise for his erroneous strategies, he remained from the capital for some time and never apologised to the people for the heavy losses suffered.

When Zhuge Ke eventually did return to Jianye, he further sternly tried to wipe out all dissent, punishing all those who disagreed with him. He further planned another attack against Cao Wei, disregarding the recent heavy losses the people had suffered and their resentment. Sun Jun decided that he had to kill Zhuge Ke. He told Sun Liang that Zhuge Ke was plotting treason, and he set up a trap at a feast for Zhuge Ke. (How much the young emperor knew of Sun Jun's plans and whether he concurred is unclear; traditional historians implied that Sun Liang knew and concurred, but he was just 10 years old at this point.) During the middle of the feast, assassins that Sun Jun had arranged for killed Zhuge Ke, and Sun Jun's forces then wiped out the Zhuge family.

Sun Jun's regency
After Sun Jun killed Zhuge Ke, he quickly moved to consolidate his power. He initially, on the surface, shared power with Teng Yin, but he, with control of the military, soon became even more dictatorial than Zhuge Ke. In particular, he falsely accused the former crown prince Sun He of conspiring with Zhuge Ke, and forced Sun He to commit suicide. His autocratic actions led to a conspiracy between Sun Ying, the Marquis of Wu, and the army officer Huan Lü, but he discovered the plan in 254, and both Sun Ying and Huan Lü were executed.

In 255, in the midst of Cao Wei's having to deal with a rebellion by Guanqiu Jian and Wen Qin, Eastern Wu forces, led by Sun Jun, tried to attack Cao Wei's border region, but withdrew after Sima Shi quickly put down the rebellion. (Wen Qin and his troops did surrender to him after they were defeated.) Later that year, another plot against Sun Jun was discovered, and a large number of officers were executed, along with Sun Quan's second daughter Sun Luyu, falsely implicated by her elder sister Sun Luban.

In 256, Sun Jun, at Wen Qin's urging, was planning an attack against Cao Wei, when he suddenly fell ill, and he commissioned his cousin Sun Chen to succeed him as regent and died soon after.

Sun Chen's regency
Sun Jun's death would precipitate a major confrontation. The general Lü Ju, who was set to lead the main force against Cao Wei, was angry that the autocratic Sun Jun appointed Sun Chen, who had not distinguished himself in any way. Lü Ju openly called for Teng Yin to become regent instead, and Teng Yin agreed to act with him. Sun Chen struck back militarily, and his forces defeated Teng Yin and Lü Ju. Teng Yin and his family were executed, while Lü Ju committed suicide. In light of his defeat of Teng Yin and Lü Ju, Sun Chen began to become extremely arrogant.

In 257, at the age of 14, Sun Liang began to personally handle some important matters of state. He established a personal guard corps, consisting of young men and officers with age similar to his, stating that he intended to grow up with them. He also sometimes questioned Sun Chen's decisions. Sun Chen began to be somewhat apprehensive of the young emperor.

Later that year, the Cao Wei general Zhuge Dan, believing that the regent Sima Zhao (Sima Shi's brother) was about to usurp the throne, declared a rebellion and requested Eastern Wu assistance. A small Eastern Wu detachment, led by Wen Qin, quickly arrived to assist him, but Sun Chen led the main forces and chose to camp a long distance away from Shouchun, where Zhuge Dan was besieged by Sima Zhao, and did nothing. When Sun Chen instead ordered the general Zhu Yi to try to relieve Shouchun with tired and unfed troops, Zhu Yi refused so Sun Chen executed him, bringing anger from the people, who had admired Zhu Yi's military skills and integrity. With Sun Chen unable to do anything, Zhuge Dan's rebellion failed in 258, and Wen Qin's troops became captives of Cao Wei.

Removal
Sun Chen knew that the people and the young emperor were both angry at him, and chose not to return to Jianye, but instead sent his confidants to be in charge of the capital's defences. Sun Liang became angrier, and plotted with his sister Sun Luban, the general Liu Cheng, his father-in-law Quan Shang, and his brother-in-law Quan Ji, to have Sun Chen overthrown. However, Quan Shang did not keep the plot secret from his wife, who was Sun Chen's cousin, and she told Sun Chen. On 9 November 258, Sun Chen quickly captured Quan Shang and killed Liu Cheng, and then surrounded the palace and forced the other officials to agree to depose Sun Liang – falsely declaring to the people that Sun Liang suffered from psychosis and was therefore incompetent. Sun Liang was demoted to a prince under the title "Prince of Kuaiji".

After removal
Sun Chen then made Sun Liang's elder brother, Sun Xiu, the Prince of Langye, the new emperor. Several months later, Sun Xiu set a trap for Sun Chen and had him arrested and killed. However, Sun Liang's position in exile did not become any safer, as Sun Xiu deeply feared that there would be plots to return Sun Liang to the throne. In July to November 260, there were rumours that Sun Liang would be emperor again, and Sun Liang's servants falsely accused him of witchcraft. Sun Xiu demoted Sun Liang to a marquis under the title "Marquis of Houguan" and sent him to his marquisate in Houguan (present-day Fuzhou, Fujian). Sun Liang died on the journey. While most historians believe that he committed suicide, an alternative theory is that Sun Xiu had him poisoned.

See also
 Lists of people of the Three Kingdoms
 List of Chinese monarchs
 Eastern Wu family trees

References

 Chen, Shou (3rd century). Records of the Three Kingdoms (Sanguozhi).
 Pei, Songzhi (5th century). Annotations to Records of the Three Kingdoms (Sanguozhi zhu).

Eastern Wu emperors
3rd-century Chinese monarchs
244 births
260 deaths
Family of Sun Quan
Dethroned monarchs
Suicides in Eastern Wu